House of Councillors elections were held in Japan on Sunday 10 July 2016 to elect 121 of the 242 members of the House of Councillors, the upper house of the National Diet, for a term of six years. As a result of the election, the Liberal Democratic Party–Komeito coalition gained ten seats for a total of 145 (60% of all seats in the house), the largest coalition achieved since the size of the house was set at 242 seats.

76 members were elected by single non-transferable vote (SNTV) and first-past-the-post (FPTP) voting in 45 multi- and single-member prefectural electoral districts; for the first time, there were two combined (gōku) single-member districts consisting of two prefectures each, Tottori-Shimane and Tokushima-Kōchi. This change and several other reapportionments were part of an electoral reform law passed by the Diet in July 2015 designed to reduce the maximum ratio of malapportionment in the House of Councillors below 3. The nationwide district which elects 48 members by D'Hondt proportional representation with most open lists remained unchanged.

The elections were the first national election after the 2015 change to the Public Offices Election Act, which allowed people from 18 years of age to vote in national, prefectural and municipal elections and in referendums. The legal voting age prior to the change was 20.

Background 
The term of members elected in the 2010 regular election (including those elected in subsequent by-elections or as runners-up) ends on July 25, 2016. Under the "Public Offices Election Act" (kōshoku-senkyo-hō), the regular election must be held within 30 days before that date, or under certain conditions if the Diet is in session or scheduled to open at that time, between 24 and 30 days after the closure of the session and thus potentially somewhat after the actual end of term. The election date was July 10 with the deadline for nominations and the start of legal campaigning 18 days before the election (i.e. June 22).

Prior to the election, the Liberal Democratic Party and its coalition partner Komeito controlled a two-thirds super-majority of seats in the House of Representatives but did not control a similar super-majority of seats in the House of Councillors, necessary to initiate amendments of the Constitution of Japan. In order to deny a super-majority to the LDP and other pro-amendment parties, the parties opposed to amending the constitution (Democratic Party, Japanese Communist Party, Social Democratic Party and People's Life Party) agreed to field a single candidate in each single-seat district, leading to a number of one-on-one races between the LDP and an opposition candidate (most of which the LDP ultimately won). Prime Minister Shinzo Abe, historically a vocal proponent of constitutional revision, generally avoided discussing the constitution during the campaign, instead focusing on his "Abenomics" economic policies.

On the eve of the election, Gerald Curtis described the race as "one of the dullest in recent memory," pointing out that "never in Japan's postwar history has the political opposition been as enfeebled as it is now... That's why widespread public disappointment with the government's economic policies hasn't hurt Mr. Abe politically. The prevailing sentiment is that he has done better than his predecessors, and replacing him with another LDP leader, let alone an opposition coalition government, would only make matters worse—especially now that the global economy is in turmoil."

Pre-election composition 

As of the official announcement (kōji, the candidate registration deadline and when the campaign starts) on 22 June (count by Yomiuri Shimbun):

In the class of members facing re-election, the ruling coalition of the Liberal Democratic Party (LDP) and Kōmeitō had a combined 60 of 121 seats, slightly short of a majority (as of June 2016). The main opposition Democratic Party held 47 seats. As the coalition held 77 seats not being contested at this election, they only needed to retain 44 seats in the election to maintain their majority in the House. The LDP, which held 117 seats alone, had to gain five seats to reach a majority of its own and make the coalition with Kōmeitō unnecessary. In the other direction, the governing coalition would have to lose 16 seats or more to forfeit its overall majority in the House of Councillors and face a technically divided Diet. However, as independents and minor opposition groups might be willing to support the government on a regular basis without inclusion in the cabinet, the losses required to face an actual divided Diet may have been much higher. If the Diet were divided after the election, the coalition's two-thirds majority in the House of Representatives could still override the House of Councillors and pass legislation, but certain Diet decisions, notably the approval of certain nominations by the cabinet such as public safety commission members or Bank of Japan governor, would require the cooperation of at least part of the opposition or an expansion of the ruling coalition.

Among the members facing re-election were House of Councillors President Masaaki Yamazaki (LDP, Fukui), Vice President Azuma Koshiishi (DPJ, Yamanashi), Justice Minister Mitsuhide Iwaki (LDP, Fukushima) and Okinawa and Science Minister Aiko Shimajiri (LDP, Okinawa).

Policy effects
The election gave a two-thirds super-majority in the upper house to the four parties in favor of constitutional revision. After the election, Abe publicly acknowledged that constitutional revision would be "not so easy" and said "I expect the discussion will be deepened." The Chinese government voiced concern about the result, while South Korean newspaper Munhwa Ilbo opined that the election results "opened the door for a Japan that can go to war."

Abe announced a major economic stimulus package following the election, leading to a spike in the Japanese stock markets.

District reapportionment 

The following districts saw a change in their representation within the House at this election. One set of reforms were introduced in 2012 and first took effect at the 2013 election; the districts affected by the 2015 reforms are shaded.

Opinion polls

Seat projections

Cabinet approval / disapproval ratings

Results 
A record 28 women won seats in the compared to 26 in 2007 and 22 in 2013. Among them, actress Junko Mihara won a seat representing Kanagawa Prefecture for the LDP.

Yoshimi Watanabe, former leader of Your Party, returned to the Diet in this election, winning a seat as part of Osaka Ishin no Kai. Justice minister Mitsuhide Iwaki lost his seat in Fukushima Prefecture to an opposition-supported candidate. Aiko Shimajiri, state minister for Okinawan affairs, lost her seat to former Ginowan, Okinawa mayor Yoichi Iha, a critic of the US military presence in Okinawa supported by a coalition of opposition parties. This was viewed by some analysts as a setback for the proposed relocation of Marine Corps Air Station Futenma. Former Olympic volleyball player Kentaro Asahi won a seat representing the Tokyo at-large district for the LDP. On the same day, journalist Satoshi Mitazono defeated incumbent Yuichiro Ito in a gubernatorial election in Kagoshima Prefecture. Mitazono campaigned on a platform focused on suspension of the Sendai Nuclear Power Plant.

By electoral district
Abbreviations and translations used in this table for (nominating – endorsing) parties:
 L – Liberal Democratic Party
 D – Democratic Party
 K – Komeito
 C - Japanese Communist Party
 S – Social Democratic Party
 I – Independent
 Osaka Ishin – Initiatives from Osaka
 PLP – People's Life Party
 Kokoro – Party for Japanese Kokoro 
 AEJ – Assembly to Energize Japan
 NRP – New Renaissance Party
 NPD – New Party Daichi
 SSN – Shiji Seitō Nashi
 Angry Voice of the People
 HRP – Happiness Realization Party

References

External links

 Major party nominations
 LDP: Candidate nominations for the 24th Councillors elections: national proportional, prefectural district direct election, endorsed
 Democratic Party: Candidate nominations for upcoming elections: 24th Councillors election proportional, direct election incl. endorsed 48th Representatives election
 Kōmeitō: Manifesto and candidates for the 2016 Councillors election
 Communist Party: Candidate nominations for the 24th Councillors election (both tiers)
 Initiatives from Osaka: Candidate nominations for the 24th Councillors election (both tiers)

Japan
2016 elections in Japan
House of Councillors (Japan) elections
July 2016 events in Japan